Marc Phillip Thomas (1949–2017) was a professor of computer science and mathematics, retired chair and a system administrator of Computer Science department at CSU Bakersfield.

His successful research projects include the resolution of the commutative Singer–Wermer conjecture and construction of a non-standard closed ideal in a certain radical Banach algebra of power series and their quotients.

Exposition 
 The Relationship between C, ANSI C, and C++
  (from Encyclopedia of Information Systems)
 
 
 Remarks on Network Security
 Typical Hacking Attempts
 Typical Buffer Overflow Hack Attempts
 Moronic Hacking
 Efficient Hacking

Publications 
 Elements in the radical of a Banach algebra obeying the unbounded Kleinecke-Shirokov conjecture
 
 Prime-like Elements and Semi-direct Products in Commutative Banach Algebras
 
 Principal Ideals and Semi-direct Products in Commutative Banach Algebras
 Single-Element Properties in Commutative Radical Banach Algebras:a Classification Scheme
 Reduction of discontinuity for derivations on Frechet algebras
 Radical Banach Algebrasand Quasinilpotent Weighted Shift Operators.
 The image of a derivation is contained in the radical

Education 
 Degree: Ph.D. (Mathematics), UC Berkeley, 1976

Related work 
 Derivations with large separating subspace

External links 
 CSUB Computer Science Department
 California State University of Bakersfield

1950 births
2017 deaths
People from Bakersfield, California
American computer scientists
American mathematicians